Stigmella rolandi is a moth of the family Nepticulidae. It is found from Germany to the Iberian Peninsula, Sardinia, Italy and Greece, and from France to central en southern Russia. It is also present in the Near East.

Adults are on wing from early June to early September. There are probably two generations per year.

The larvae feed on Rosa pimpinellifolia, Rosa rugosa and Sanguisorba minor. They mine the leaves of their host plant. The mine consists of a rather broad corridor that often follows the serration of the leaf margin. The frass line is quite broad, especially in the first part of the mine.

References

External links
Stigmella rolandi Sp. n.: A Widespread Southern European Species On Rosa (Lepidoptera: Nepticulidae)
Photo

Nepticulidae
Moths described in 1990
Moths of Europe
Moths of Asia